The 1923 Newfoundland general election was held on 3 May 1923 to elect members of the 25th General Assembly of Newfoundland in the Dominion of Newfoundland. The Liberal Reform Party, an alliance between the Liberals led by Richard Squires and the Fishermen's Protective Union of William Coaker, formed the government. The Liberal-Labour-Progressive party, now led by William J. Higgins, formed the opposition. Squires was forced to resign as Prime Minister in 1923 after allegations of corruption were brought forward. William Warren became Liberal Reform Party leader and Prime Minister. After Warren's government was defeated following a motion of no confidence, Albert Hickman was asked to form a government and Warren joined Higgins in a new Liberal-Conservative Progressive Party.

Seat totals

Elected members

 Bay de Verde
 William H. Cave Liberal Reform
 Richard Cramm Liberal Reform
 Bonavista Bay
 William F. Coaker Liberal Reform
 Robert G. Winsor Liberal Reform
 John Abbott Liberal Reform
 Burgeo-LaPoile
 Harvey Small Liberal Reform
 Burin
 George C. Harris Liberal-Labour-Progressive
 Samuel J. Foote Liberal Reform
 Carbonear
 James Moore Liberal-Labour-Progressive
 Ferryland
 Peter J. Cashin Liberal-Labour-Progressive
 Phillip F. Moore Liberal-Labour-Progressive
 Fogo
 George F. Grimes Liberal Reform
 Fortune Bay
 William R. Warren Liberal Reform
 Harbour Grace
 A. W. Piccott Liberal Reform
 E. Simmons Liberal Reform
 A. M. Calpin Liberal Reform
 Harbour Main
 Matthew E. Hawco Liberal Reform
 William J. Woodford Liberal-Labour-Progressive
 Placentia and St. Mary's
 Michael S. Sullivan Liberal-Labour-Progressive
 William J. Walsh Liberal-Labour-Progressive
 E. Sinnott Liberal-Labour-Progressive
 Port de Grave
 Harry A. Winter Liberal Reform (speaker)
 St. Barbe
 J. H. Scammell Liberal Reform
 St. George's
 Joseph F. Downey Liberal Reform
 St. John's East
 William J. Higgins Liberal-Labour-Progressive
 Cyril J. Fox Liberal-Labour-Progressive
 N. J. Vinnicombe Liberal-Labour-Progressive
 St. John's West
 C. E. Hunt Liberal-Labour-Progressive
 Michael P. Cashin Liberal-Labour-Progressive
 Richard A. Squires Liberal Reform
 Trinity Bay
 William W. Halfyard Liberal Reform
 Richard Hibbs Liberal Reform
 I. R. Randell Liberal Reform
 Twillingate
 Kenneth M. Brown Liberal Reform
 Arthur Barnes Liberal Reform
 George Jones Liberal Reform

References 
 

1923
1923 elections in North America
1923 elections in Canada
Politics of the Dominion of Newfoundland
1923 in Newfoundland
May 1923 events